Acrocercops thylacaula is a moth of the family Gracillariidae. It is known from India (Maharashtra).

The larvae feed on Allophylus cobbe. They mine the leaves of their host plant.

References

thylacaula
Moths described in 1932
Moths of Asia